The stripe-headed antpitta (Grallaria andicolus) is a species of bird in the family Grallariidae. It was first described by German ornithologist Jean Louis Cabanis. It is found in Peru and western Bolivia. Its natural habitat is subtropical or tropical moist montane forest.

References

stripe-headed antpitta
Birds of the Peruvian Andes
stripe-headed antpitta
Taxonomy articles created by Polbot